Pillaiyar Theru Kadaisi Veedu is a 2011 Tamil-language romantic drama film written and directed by newcomer Thirumalai Kishore and starring Jithan Ramesh along with Sanchita Padukone. Suhasini, Jayaprakash, Prakash Raj, Soori, and Bose Venkat play supporting roles. The film is the 81st from Ramesh's home production Super Good Films. The score was by Telugu composer Chakri in his debut and only Tamil film he had worked so far. The film released on 24 June 2011.

Plot

Ganesan (Jithan Ramesh) is a happy-go-lucky youth in a village. A great admirer of actor-director T. Rajendar, he spends time with his friends, such as Soori and a few others. This is ridiculed by his father (Jayaprakash). Ganesh's life takes a turn when he comes across Sandhya (Sanchita Padukone). She is a friend of his sister, who comes on a vacation to the village. He admires her beauty and falls for her. When Ganesh gathers guts to open his heart to Sandhya, enters Valli (Suhasini), Ganesh's uncle's (Ilavarasu) daughter. Fearing that her father will get her married to a local goon named Durai (Bose Venkat), she decides to marry Ganesh. Suddenly, Sandhya falls ill, and Ganesh takes her to the hospital. He is shocked when the doctor (Prakash Raj) informs that she has pancreatic cancer and will die in a few months. Ganesh, in a bid to keep her happy until her death, marries her and comes home. Unfortunately, he incurs his father's wrath and is driven out of the house. However, a sudden twist in the plot causes the movie to end on an emotional note.

Cast

 Jithan Ramesh as Ganesan
 Sanchita Padukone as Sandhya
 Suhasini as Valli
 Jayaprakash as Ganesh's father
 Akila as Gowri, Ganesan sister
 Prakash Raj as Doctor
 Soori as Ganesan's friend
 Bose Venkat as Durai
 Ilavarasu as Ganesan's uncle
 Rama as Valli's mother
 Swaminathan as Police Inspector
 Chitti Babu as Doctor

Soundtrack 
The soundtrack was composed by Chakri  in his first and only Tamil film. The song "Enakkoru Devathai" was a remake of composer's own telugu song "Nuvvekadunte" from Gopi Gopika Godavari.
"Osiyila" - Mukesh Mohamed
"Enakkoru Devathai" - Hariharan, Kousalya
"Rasathi" - Achu
"Gnanapanditha" - Sanjana
"Pillayar Kovil" - Chakri

Critical reception
The Hindu wrote: "Pillaiyaar Theru Kadaisi Veedu only gives a sense of déjà vu. But the final sequences are suspenseful [sic] comes a twist to the tale. And the sudden shift to serious mode catches you unawares. Writer-director Thirumalai Kishore, a first-timer, scores with a story that's strong and narration that's reasonably intelligent." The New Indian Express wrote that "Thirumalai Kishore’s directorial debut has a clichéd storyline and loosely-scripted characters." Sify wrote that "Why did Jithan Ramesh agree to do such a lifeless and tasteless film?".

Behindwoods wrote: "Overall PTKV is a movie that was intended to be simple and straight; about family, love and sentiments".

References

External links
 

2011 films
2010s Tamil-language films
Films scored by Chakri
Indian drama films
2011 directorial debut films
Films directed by Kishore Tirumala
Super Good Films films